'Solosmasthana' are 16 sacred places in Sri Lanka, believed by Buddhists to have been hallowed by visits of Gautama Buddha. These places of worship are among the most important religious locations in Sri Lanka, and are located throughout the country. Ancient Buddhist and historical sources of Sri Lanka assert that the Buddha visited the country on three occasions. These three visits are given in some detail in the ancient chronicle Mahavamsa, which describes his journeys to eleven of the Solosmasthana. Other sources such as the Pujavaliya, Samantapasadika and Butsarana also mention these visits.

History
The first visit was made to Mahiyangana in the ninth month after the Buddha attained enlightenment. The Mahavamsa says that he conquered the yakshas there and sent them to an island named Giri, thereby setting the background for the establishment of Buddhism in the country later on, where the Buddha knew that the Dhamma would prevail "in all its glory". The Buddha's second visit to Sri Lanka was made to Nagadipa in the fifth year after attaining enlightenment, where he settled a dispute between Naga kings Chulodara and Mahodara regarding a jeweled chair. In the eighth year after enlightenment, the Buddha made his third and final visit to the country accompanied by 500 bhikkhus. This visit was to Kelaniya and was due to an invitation by a Naga king named Maniakkika, who had asked the Buddha to come to his kingdom during the previous visit. After a discourse on Dharma at Maniakkika's abode, the Mahavamsa records that the Buddha visited Samantakuta, Diva Guhava, Dighavapi, and the places where the Jaya Sri Maha Bodhi, Ruwanwelisaya, Thuparamaya and Sela Cetiya now stand. The Samantapasadika mentions that the Buddha also visited Muthiyangana during this visit. It is possible that the other sites may have been included in Solosmasthana because of the monumental stupas built by Buddhist kings at these locations.

With the decline of the ancient kingdoms of Anuradhapura and Polonnaruwa, most of the Solosmasthana were abandoned. It was not until the 20th century that all of them received the attention of the Sangha and Buddhists in the country and were renovated. A Pali gatha, praising the Solosmasthana, is in use among Buddhists. This gatha, which lists all of the Solosmasthana, is recited especially when making offerings to the Buddha.

Solosmasthana

See also
 Atamasthana
 Cetiya

Notes

References
Specific

General

Buddhist mythology
Buddhist pilgrimage sites in Sri Lanka